Luis Gordillo (born 1934) is a Spanish artist and author. He is one of Spain's most prolific painters, and has received numerous awards including the National Award for Plastic Arts and the Premio Velázquez de las Artes Plásticas. Some of his work is exhibited at the Reina Sofia Museum in Spain.

Early life
Luis Gordillo was born in 1934 in Seville, Spain and was the second of eight children. He went to law school, but later decided to focus on art, attending the School of Fine Arts in Seville.

Career
After completing his studies, Gordillo decided to move to Paris in 1958. At the time Spain was a dictatorship under Francisco Franco and art and media were heavily censored. Moving to Paris furthered his art studies in a country where he was free to do so.

During the 1960s he experienced an artist crisis, only drawing basic shapes and forms. In 1970 he experienced a renewal, utilizing bright colors.

In the 1980s his painting became less colorful and more abstract.

In 2017 he published an art book called Little Memories.

Awards
National Award for Plastic Arts (1981)
Premio Velázquez de las Artes Plásticas (2007)

Notable works
Gran bombo duplex (1967)
Choque (1968)
Caballero cubista con lágrimas (1973)
Suicida triple (1974)
Sistema lábil (1975–76)
Serie Luna (1977)
Salta-ojos (conejitos) (1980)
Despectivo en campo verde (1981)
Segunda serie roja (1982)

References

External links 
 Official website

1934 births
Living people
Spanish artists
People from Seville
Painters from Andalusia